The  Department for Infrastructure and Transport (DIT), formerly the Department of Planning, Transport and Infrastructure (DPTI), is a large department of the government of South Australia. The website was renamed , but without a formal announcement of change of name or change in documentation about its governance or functionality.

Ministerial responsibility 
The minister responsible for all aspects of the department's operations in the Marshall government was Stephan Knoll, Minister for Transport, Infrastructure and Local Government, and Minister for Planning. He served from March 2018, until his resignation in the wake of an expenses scandal on 26 July 2020. 

The Urban Renewal Authority, trading as Renewal SA, was within the minister's portfolio responsibilities until 28 July 2020, when it was moved to that of the treasurer, Rob Lucas.

Corey Wingard was sworn in as Minister for Infrastructure and Transport on 29 July 2020.

Chief executive officer
Former chief executive officer Michael Deegan, appointed on 25 July 2014 after the sacking of Rod Hook, was sacked on 21 March 2018 by the incoming administration of Steven Marshall, following the state election of 17 March 2018.

, Tony Braxton-Smith is CEO.

References

External links

Infrastructure and Transport
Road authorities
Year of establishment unknown
State departments of transport of Australia
Transport in South Australia